During the 2006 season Gloucestershire County Cricket Club played in the Liverpool Victoria County Championship Division 2, the C&G Trophy South Conference, the Natwest Pro40 Division 2 and the Twenty20 Cup Mid/West/Wales Division.

Players 
  Hamish Marshall
  Ian Harvey
 Steve Adshead
 Kadeer Ali
 James Averis
 Martyn Ball
 Ian Fisher
 Alex Gidman
 Carl Greenidge
 Mark Hardinges
 Steve Kirby
 Chris Taylor
 James Pearson
 William Rudge
 Stephen Snell
/ Craig Spearman
 Phil Weston
 Matt Windows
  Matt Windows

Liverpool Victoria County Championship Division 2

Table

Batting Averages

Results

Tuesday 18 April 2006 - Gloucestershire 	v 	Somerset - Bristol

Result: Gloucestershire won by an innings and 7 runs
Points: Gloucestershire 22, Somerset 3

Toss: Somerset
Umpires: N L Bainton, N G Cowley

Scorecard

Wednesday 3 May 2006 - Surrey 	v 	Gloucestershire -The Brit Oval

Result: Surrey won by an innings and 297 runs
Points: Surrey 22, Gloucestershire 2

Toss: Gloucestershire
Umpires: G I Burgess, N J Llong

Scorecard

Wednesday 10 May 2006 - Gloucestershire 	v 	Northamptonshire - Bristol

Result: Gloucestershire won by 6 wickets
Points: Gloucestershire 18, Northamptonshire 4

Toss: Northamptonshire
Umpires: R K Illingworth, P Willey

Scorecard

Tuesday 23 May 2006 - Essex 	v 	Gloucestershire - Chelmsford

Result: Match drawn
Points: Essex 11, Gloucestershire 11

Toss: Gloucestershire
Umpires: M R Benson, J W Lloyds

Scorecard

Friday 2 June 2006 - Gloucestershire 	v 	Worcestershire - Bristol

Result: Match drawn
Points: Gloucestershire 11, Worcestershire 12

Toss: Worcestershire
Umpires: D J Constant, B Leadbeater

Scorecard

Wednesday 14 June 2006 - Gloucestershire 	v 	Derbyshire - Bristol

Result: Match drawn
Points: Gloucestershire 11, Derbyshire 11

Toss: Derbyshire
Umpires: N A Mallender, R Palmer

Scorecard

Tuesday 20 June 2006 - Leicestershire 	v 	Gloucestershire - Grace Road

Result: Gloucestershire won by 7 wickets
Points: Gloucestershire 19, Leicestershire 7

Toss: Gloucestershire
Umpires: R K Illingworth, T E Jesty

Scorecard

Thursday 13 July 2006 - Gloucestershire 	v 	Essex - Bristol

Result: Essex won by 7 wickets
Points: Essex 22, Gloucestershire 6

Toss: Gloucestershire
Umpires: I J Gould, T E Jesty

Scorecard

Thursday 20 July 2006 - Worcestershire 	v 	Gloucestershire - New Road

Result: Worcestershire won by 58 runs
Points: Worcestershire 19, Gloucestershire 5

Toss: Worcestershire
Umpires: M J Harris, P Willey

Scorecard

Wednesday 26 July 2006 - Gloucestershire 	v 	Glamorgan - Cheltenham College

Result: Glamorgan won by 10 wickets
Points: Glamorgan 22, Gloucestershire 6

Toss: Glamorgan
Umpires: V A Holder, G Sharp

Scorecard

Wednesday 2 August 2006 - Gloucestershire 	v 	Leicestershire - Cheltenham College

Result: Leicestershire won by 4 wickets
Points: Leicestershire 22, Gloucestershire 4

Toss: Gloucestershire
Umpires: R A Kettleborough, N A Mallender

Scorecard

Tuesday 8 August 2006 - Northamptonshire 	v 	Gloucestershire - Northampton

Result: Match drawn
Points: Northamptonshire 12, Gloucestershire 10

Toss: Northamptonshire
Umpires: J H Evans, A A Jones

Scorecard

Thursday 17 August 2006 - Derbyshire 	v 	Gloucestershire - Derby

Result: Match drawn
Points: Derbyshire 12, Gloucestershire 7

Toss: Gloucestershire
Umpires: N G Cowley, J W Holder

Scorecard

Tuesday 22 August 2006 - Somerset 	v 	Gloucestershire - Taunton

Result: Somerset won by an innings and 76 runs
Points: Somerset 22, Gloucestershire 3

Toss: Somerset
Umpires: M J Harris, B Leadbeater

Scorecard

Wednesday 6 September 2006 - Gloucestershire 	v 	Surrey - Bristol

Result: Match drawn
Points: Gloucestershire 12, Surrey 9

Toss: Surrey
Umpires: N L Bainton, D J Constant

Scorecard

Wednesday 20 September 2006 - Glamorgan 	v 	Gloucestershire - Sophia Gardens

Result: Match drawn
Points: Glamorgan 11, Gloucestershire 10

Toss: Gloucestershire
Umpires: P J Hartley, A A Jones

Scorecard

Cricket records and statistics
Gloucestershire County Cricket Club seasons